Juanjuí is a town in Northern Peru, capital of the province Mariscal Cáceres in the San Martín Region and located in the left edge of Huallaga River. There are 54,006 inhabitants, according to the 2010 census.

History

The Spanish captain José Gaspar López Salcedo founded this city on September 24, 1827 under the name of Juanjui a contraction of "Juan Huido" (Juan, the escaped). The population of Juanjui originally formed mainly by immigrants from Lamas from the late eighteenth and early decades of the nineteenth century.

It is said that the pioneer of these immigrants was an Amerindian named Juan, who fled the Lamas, or by the mistreatment or persecution for justice of the missionaries. He came to give these territories and to live with the people of Chacho Village. After some years he returned to Lamas and brought his family and some other families who came attracted by the abundance of references wildlife. This immigration was intensified even further the independence cause. By then the settlement of Chacho Lamas was already known as the land of "Juan Huido", with it came more immigrants from Lamas.

Over the years, Juan Huido was derived the name of Juanjui to designate in any way to these territories.

On July 2, 1940. Juanjui was declared capital city of the new province of Mariscal Caceres.

Geography

Climate 
Juanjui has a tropical climate, warm and humid.

Neighborhoods

In Juanjui, there are 8 representative neighborhoods around downtown:

Chambira
Juanjuicillo
La Merced
La Victoria
Puerto Amberes
San Juan
Santa Rosa

Gran Pajaten monuments

The town has some monuments dedicated to the ancient Gran Pajaten settlement that is located close by. This is related to Chachapoya culture.

Twin towns - Sister cities 
 Chiclayo, Peru
 Chiba Prefecture, Japan
 Tingo Maria, Peru
 Utrecht, Netherlands
 Hafnarfjörður, Iceland
 Cordoba, Argentina

See also
Kuelap

References

External links

  www.juanjui.com
 

Populated places in the San Martín Region